Woodstock Transit is operated by the City of Woodstock, Ontario, Canada, providing both regular transit bus routes and specialized paratransit services for the community.

Public transit service in Woodstock dates back to 1900 when the Woodstock, Thames Valley and Ingersoll Electric Railway Company began operation with electric interurban streetcars between Woodstock and Ingersoll, then replacement bus service from 1925 until 1942. Bluebird Coach Lines then ran the local transit service until the early 1950s when the City took over.

Scheduled service
Regular transit buses currently operate on seven routes at half-hour intervals. Service operates between the hours of 6:00 a.m. and 10:00 p.m. Monday to Friday, and from 8:00 a.m. to 10:00 p.m. on Saturday. There is no Sunday or holiday service.

All buses operate on one-way loops from the transit terminal at 623 Dundas Street.

Para Transit
Para transit service is provided by the city on Monday to Saturday from 6 a.m. to 10:00 p.m. All users of the system must be registered.

Proposed changes
A proposed change to the transit system is to use an off-street transit terminal at the corner of York and Dundas Streets.

See also

 Public transport in Canada

References

External links

Woodstock Transit map
City of Woodstock: TRANSIT RIDERSHIP GROWTH AND ASSET MANAGEMENT PLAN

Transit agencies in Ontario
Transport in Woodstock, Ontario